Toufik Mansour is an Israeli mathematician working in algebraic combinatorics. He is a member of the Druze community and is the first Israeli Druze to become a professional mathematician.

Mansour obtained his Ph.D. in mathematics from the University of Haifa in 2001 under Alek Vainshtein. As of 2007, he is a professor of mathematics at the University of Haifa. 
He served as chair of the department from 2015 to 2017. He has previously been a faculty member of the Center for Combinatorics at Nankai University from 2004 to 2007, and at The John Knopfmacher Center for Applicable Analysis and Number Theory at the University of the Witwatersrand.

Mansour is an expert on Discrete Mathematics and its applications. In particular, he is interested in permutation patterns, colored permutations, set partitions, combinatorics on words, and compositions. He has written more than 260 research papers, which means that he publishes a paper roughly every 20 days, or that he produces one publication page roughly every day.

Books
.
.
.

See also
List of Israeli Druze
Schröder–Hipparchus number

References

External links
Home page and list of publications
Google Scholar profile
ORCID profile

Israeli mathematicians
1968 births
Living people